Marygrove College was a private Roman Catholic graduate college in Detroit, Michigan, affiliated with the Sisters, Servants of the Immaculate Heart of Mary.  It announced its closure on December 17, 2019, at end of the fall semester.

History

The college grew out of a postgraduate tutorial offered to one young woman graduate of St. Mary's Academy in Monroe, Michigan, in 1899.  By 1905 it had grown to a two-year college for women and in 1910 it was a four-year college chartered to grant degrees. It was then known as St. Mary's College. The college moved to its current location in Detroit in 1927, and at that time became known as Marygrove College.  When it moved to Detroit its president was George Hermann Derry, who was the first lay person to serve as a president of a Catholic women's college in the United States.

In the decades after World War I, Marygrove College was an important local center of Catholic social action.  Faculty members were chosen for their education, character, and faith, and President Derry encouraged each student to look beyond the prospect of eventual marriage and to become capable of "doing her part in the world's work in whatever sphere of life she may be placed". By 1936, the college catalog spoke in far more emphatic terms of female independence. In 1937, Sister Honora Jack became the college's first woman president.  The college accepted its first black student in 1938.

Marygrove College was originally a women's college.  It became co-educational in about 1970 during the presidency of Arthur Brown.

Glenda D. Price was appointed as the college's first African-American woman president in 1988.  Dr. Price retired in 2006 and continues to be active in Detroit's community revival, most recently with her appointment to the city's financial advisory board.

In the final years several controversial events on campus occurred, including protests over the use of college facilities by the LGBT group Dignity USA, and the opening of a Muslim prayer room.

The final president, beginning in 2016, was Marygrove alumna Dr. Elizabeth Burns.

The college closed all undergraduate programs at the end of the Fall 2017 semester ostensibly to focus exclusively on graduate programs with a reduced staff and faculty. It had around 1,000 undergraduates in the college at the time. On June 7, 2019, the school administration announced it would cease operation the fall 2019 semester.

The contents of the library were transferred to the Internet Archive, which imported the catalog into OpenLibrary.org and had over 50,000 scanned books online by March 2020.

The school's chapel is now used by St. Peter Claver Catholic Church, a nearby parish whose building collapsed in 2018.

The school buildings were listed on the National Register of Historic Places in 2022.

Campus

The current college encompasses a  campus. There are large lawns and mature trees. The Madame Cadillac and Liberal Arts buildings, by architect D.A. Bohlen & Son, are Tudor Gothic structures with stained glass windows, wrought iron gates, carved wood decorations, high ceilings, arched doorways, and carved stonework.  The campus was listed on the National Register of Historic Places in 2022.

Athletics
The Marygrove athletic teams were called the Mustangs. The college was a member of the National Association of Intercollegiate Athletics (NAIA), primarily competing in the Wolverine–Hoosier Athletic Conference (WHAC) from 2012–13 to the fall of the 2017–18 academic year. They were also a member of the United States Collegiate Athletic Association (USCAA) from 2002–03 to the fall of the 2017–18 academic year. The Mustangs previously competed as an NAIA Independent within the Association of Independent Institutions (AII) from 2008–09 to 2011–12.

Marygrove competed in 15 intercollegiate varsity sports: Men's sports included basketball, cross country, golf, lacrosse, soccer, baseball, and track & field (indoor and outdoor); while women's sports included basketball, cross country, golf, soccer, track & field (indoor and outdoor) and volleyball.

History
The college added golf to its list of athletic programs with the installation of a new golf practice facility in the fall of 2010. Marygrove's golf practice facility, designed by world-renowned golf course architect Tom Doak, offered a leading urban land use plan, incorporating golf practice and other athletic facilities on a small urban land tract. In addition to the unique use of urban land for golf, the Golf Practice Facility incorporated environment-friendly land use and techniques, including minimal disruption to current trees, and used recycled water for irrigation and natural pesticides.

Discontinuation
With the August 2017 announcement of the closing of the school's undergraduate programs, the school also announced that all athletics would cease after the 2017 fall season.

Accreditation history
Marygrove was first accredited by the North Central Association of Colleges and Secondary Schools in 1926.

Marygrove was accredited by NCA's (North Central Association) Higher Learning Commission,
the Michigan State Department of Education and the Council of Social Work and Education.

Alumni

References

External links

 Official website
 Official athletics website 

Liberal arts colleges in Michigan
Monroe, Michigan
Educational institutions established in 1905
Association of Catholic Colleges and Universities
Universities and colleges in Detroit
USCAA member institutions
Catholic universities and colleges in Michigan
Roman Catholic Archdiocese of Detroit
Former women's universities and colleges in the United States
1905 establishments in Michigan
History of women in Michigan
National Register of Historic Places in Detroit